Cheryomukha is a rural locality (a selo) in Krasnoyarsky Selsoviet, Krasnoyarsky District, Astrakhan Oblast, Russia. The population was 1,157 as of 2010. There are 18 streets.

Geography 
Cheryomukha is located 5 km south of Krasny Yar (the district's administrative centre) by road. Krasny Yar is the nearest rural locality.

References 

Rural localities in Krasnoyarsky District, Astrakhan Oblast